Saku Savolainen (born 13 August 1996) is a Finnish football player. He plays for KuPS.

Club career
He made his Veikkausliiga debut for KuPS on 23 May 2013 in a game against JJK.

References

External links
 

1996 births
People from Iisalmi
Living people
Finnish footballers
Finland youth international footballers
Finland under-21 international footballers
Kuopion Palloseura players
Veikkausliiga players
Pallo-Kerho 37 players
Association football forwards
Sportspeople from North Savo